Linguistic frequency is a vague phrase that can be used in reference to either:
 Word frequency, frequency of words in a given corpus
 Letter frequency, the frequency of letters of a given language